Kim Hae-sol (born April 13, 1989), known as Zion.T, is a South Korean hip hop and R&B singer signed to The Black Label, a subsidiary label of YG Entertainment managed by Teddy Park and Kush. He has released a studio album, Red Light (2013) and two extended plays. He has also been featured on tracks by well-known K-pop artists such as G-Dragon, Zico, and Psy.

Personal life
In an interview with Kpopeurope in 2014, Zion.T explained that he chose his stage name because "I am a Christian and so the "T" in my name is representative of the cross."

In a 2017 CBS No Cut News interview, he said he was influenced by the American musician T-Pain. "There was a time when T-Pain's style of hip hop vocals were in. I really like T-Pain, so I used to emulate him a lot. [Evident in his debut single 'Click Me'.] This is something only my friends know, but I even had the nickname 'Zion.T-Pain'."

Career
Zion.T made his musical debut in 2011, collaborating with Korean hip hop artists such as Dok2, Crucial Star, Simon D, Primary and Gray. His first single, "Click Me", featuring Dok2, was released in April 2011.

On April 9, 2013, Zion.T's first studio album, Red Light, was released with the title track "Babay", featuring Gaeko. The album was critically well-received.

That year, he featured on tracks by Infinite H, Dynamic Duo, Swings and G-Dragon. In December, he released the EP Mirrorball ("") with the title track "Miss Kim".

In 2014, he released the digital single "Yanghwa BRDG", which became a hit and contributed to his rising mainstream success as an artist in Korea. The song's honest, personal nature connected with a wide range of audiences.

He also appeared on the soundtrack of the television drama series Pinocchio with the song "Kiss Me", and featured on songs by Seo In-young and The Quiett.

On February 1, 2015, he collaborated with the Korean R&B singer Crush on the single "Just". The same year, he released the digital singles "Zero Gravity", "Eat" and "No Make Up" and featured on singles by SHINee's Jonghyun, Yankie and Psy. That July, he participated in the biennial music festival event hosted by the MBC variety show Infinite Challenge, which resulted in a spike in domestic sales of his previously released singles. For the event, he partnered with the Infinite Challenge cast member Haha to perform under the name Eutteugeottasi with the song "$ponsor", later released in an album of the songs performed at the event.

Zion.T finished the year with two wins at the annual Mnet Asian Music Awards,: Best Vocal Performance (Male) for "Eat "  and Best Collaboration, with Crush, for the song "Just" , beating more well-established artistes in an idol-focused industry.

In 2016, following the end of his contract with the hip hop label Amoeba Culture, he signed with The Black Label, a sub-label of YG Entertainment. On February 1, 2017, he released his first EP under The Black Label, OO.

In December 2017, he released his collaboration with the veteran singer Lee Moon-se, the song "Snow". It topped all major music charts in South Korea. Lee Moon-se said he listened to Zion.T's song more than 200 times to faithfully represent his song, and showed great affection towards Zion.T and his musical career.

In August 2022, Zion.T established his own entertainment company, Standard Friends, and signed Wonstein as his first artist. He will still be represented by The Black Label as a singer.

Discography

Studio albums
 Red Light (2013)

Filmography

Television shows

Awards and nominations

Listicles

References

External links

1989 births
Living people
South Korean hip hop singers
South Korean pop singers
South Korean record producers
MAMA Award winners
Korean Music Award winners
21st-century South Korean male  singers
Melon Music Award winners
South Korean male singer-songwriters